Prorasea praeia is a moth in the family Crambidae. It was described by Harrison Gray Dyar Jr. in 1917. It is found in North America, where it has been recorded from Arizona, British Columbia, California and Montana.

References

Evergestinae
Moths described in 1917